Cary Kwok (Siu Hang Cary Kwok) is a Hong Kong-born London-based British artist who specialises in fine detailed blue biro (ball point pen) drawings and humorous erotic works.

Kwok attended a footwear course in Hong Kong where he learned his shoe making skills before moving to London to further his studies. He spent six years at Central Saint Martins College of Art and Design studying fashion at BA (Hons) and  MA levels, graduating in 2001 with a Master of Arts in Fashion Design:  Womenswear.

His subjects often vary from male nude to period fashions. Hairstyles and shoes are also among his favorite subjects.

He is represented by Herald St, London Gallery in London and has exhibited internationally in London, Miami, New York City, Tokyo, Zurich, Paris, Hong Kong and Geneva with galleries such as Herald St, Galerie Emmanuel Perrotin, Hauser & Wirth, FLAG Art Foundation, Institute of Contemporary Arts, Tate Britain, White Columns, Nasu Taro, Opening Ceremony and Hard Hat.

References

External links 
Official website 
Cary Kwok, Herald St London 
Cary Kwok Desire 2009, Herald St London 
Cary Kwok, Galerie Emmanuel Perrotin 
Cary Kwok 2007, Herald St London 

Living people
1975 births